Merna Pauline Lesauvage (née Reinke; December 14, 1911 – January 7, 1998), known professionally as Pauline Rennie, was a Canadian voice actress whose career included voice roles on Care Bears. Rennie, who hailed from Toronto, provided the voice of Fizgerald Fieldmouse on Maggie Muggins, as well as voices on Mary Grannan's follow-up 1960 series for the Canadian Broadcasting Corporation, Just Mary.

Filmography
 Maggie Muggins (1955) - Fizgerald Fieldmouse
 Just Mary (1960)
 The Care Bears Movie (1985) - Grams Bear, Cozy Heart Penguin
 Care Bears (1985) - Grams Bear, Cozy Heart Penguin, Treat Heart Pig
 Star Wars: Ewoks (1985-1986)
 The Care Bears Family (1986-1988) - Grams Bear, Cozy Heart Penguin
 Popples (1986) - Pancake
 The Raccoons (1987) - Aunt Gertie

References

External links
 

Canadian television actresses
Canadian voice actresses
1911 births
1998 deaths